Events from the year 1824 in Sweden

Incumbents
 Monarch – Charles XIV John

Events

 2 January - First issue of the conservative Stockholms Dagblad.
 - First issue of Linköpings ASS.
 - Jöns Jacob Berzelius identifies boron.

Births

 21 January - Bertha Valerius, photographer and painter (died 1895) 
 28 June - Adolf W. Edelsvärd, architect (died 1919) 
 25 November- Amalia Eriksson, inventor of the polkagris,  (died 1923) 
 27 December – Charlotta Norberg, ballerina   (died 1892)

Deaths

 28 June - Hans Henric von Essen, politician and courtier  (born 1755) 
 20 November - Carl Axel Arrhenius, chemist (born 1757)

References

 
Years of the 19th century in Sweden